Fraser High School is a high school located in Fraser, Michigan within the metro Detroit region. It is the only high school in the Fraser Public Schools district. The school serves grades 9 through 12.

Athletics 
Fraser is a member of the Michigan High School Athletic Association and competes in the Macomb Area Conference.

The school has appeared in five MHSAA Finals for girls volleyball, most recently in 2006. The Ramblers had three consecutive appearances in the 2002, 2003, and 2004 seasons, winning back-to-back Class A Championships in the latter years.

Currently, Fraser sponsors eleven girls' and eleven boys' varsity sports and is Title IX compliant.

Recognition 
In April 2022, teacher Stacie Yokhana received a Milken Educator Award. She is the first recipient from Fraser Public Schools since 1990.

A student/teacher team from Fraser was also nominated to participate in a National History Day competition 2022 Sacrifice for Freedom®: World War II in the Pacific Student & Teacher Institute; a six-month long research project culminating in a presentation to be given at the Pearl Harbor National Memorial in June.

References

External links 
 

Schools in Macomb County, Michigan
Public high schools in Michigan